The following is a list of Miss International pageant edition and information.

Host country/territory by number 

Currently 8 hosts former mainly held in the United States, 46 current mainly hosts inside of Japan, 54 current mainly hosts inside of Home Country  and 6 hosts outside Home Country.

 No pageants held in 1966, 2020, and 2021

Notes

External links
Official Miss International website - Past places

 Editions
Lists of beauty pageants editions